Rikki Fleming (born 29 December 1946) is a Scottish former footballer, who played for Ayr United, Hibernian and Berwick Rangers in the Scottish Football League.

References

External links

1946 births
Living people
Scottish footballers
Association football central defenders
Footballers from Paisley, Renfrewshire
Scottish Football League players
Benburb F.C. players
Rangers F.C. players
Ayr United F.C. players
Hibernian F.C. players
Berwick Rangers F.C. players
Scottish Football League representative players